Elias Abouchabaka (born 31 March 2000) is a German professional footballer who plays as a midfielder.

Club career
Abouchabaka made his professional debut for Greuther Fürth on 20 August 2018, appearing in the first round of the 2018–19 DFB-Pokal against Bundesliga side Borussia Dortmund. He was substituted on in the 97th minute for Julian Green, with the match finishing as a 1–2 loss after extra time.

On 31 January 2020, Abouchabaka moved to Portuguese Primeira Liga club Vitória Guimarães on a deal until June 2024. He got his official debut on 11 June 2020 against Belenenses SAD.

International career
In 2017, Abouchabaka was included in Germany's squad for the 2017 UEFA European Under-17 Championship in Croatia. He scored three goals in the tournament in which Germany managed to reach the semi-finals, before losing on penalties to Spain. Later that year, he was included in Germany's squad for the 2017 FIFA U-17 World Cup in India, where Germany were eliminated in the quarter-finals.

Personal life
Abouchabaka was born in Berlin, Germany and is of Moroccan descent.

Honours
Germany
UEFA European Under-17 Championship Team of the Tournament: 2017

References

External links
 
 
 
 
 

2000 births
Living people
Footballers from Berlin
German footballers
Germany youth international footballers
German people of Moroccan descent
Association football midfielders
RB Leipzig players
SpVgg Greuther Fürth players
SpVgg Greuther Fürth II players
Vitória S.C. players
Vitória S.C. B players
Regionalliga players
2. Bundesliga players
German expatriate footballers
German expatriate sportspeople in Portugal
Expatriate footballers in Portugal
21st-century German people